The 2022–23 season is the 121st season in the existence of Brighton & Hove Albion Football Club and the club's sixth consecutive season in the Premier League. In addition to the league, they will also compete in the FA Cup and the EFL Cup.

Summary

Brighton's opening game of the Premier League season made history, with The Seagulls recording their first ever win at Old Trafford in the 2–1 victory over Manchester United. Pascal Groß scored a brace, taking his tally up to four goals in total against the Red Devils. The win also recorded back to back victories, having won 4–0 in the last home game of the previous season. Brighton set a club record of nine consecutive top-flight matches without defeat after their 1–0 home win over Leeds on 27 August. However, any chance of extending this was ended in their next match after losing 2–1 at Fulham with Lewis Dunk scoring his sixth Premier League own goal of his career. 

Five days later, Brighton beat Leicester 5–2 at Falmer Stadium, with this being the first time the Seagulls have scored five goals in a Premier League fixture. On 8 September, Graham Potter left Brighton for Chelsea following the sacking of Thomas Tuchel. Andrew Crofts former Brighton player and current under-23's head coach took over as interim head coach with current player Adam Lallana acting as interim first-team coach.

On 18 September 2022, Brighton announced Roberto De Zerbi as the club's new head coach on a four-year contract. 
His first match in charge came on 1 October, which ended in a 3–3 draw away at Liverpool with Leandro Trossard scoring all three of Brighton's goals, becoming the first Brighton player to score a Premier League hat-trick. Brighton had led Liverpool 2–1 at the break before going 3–2 down, with Trossard scoring an 83rd minute equaliser. De Zerbi lost his first match at Falmer Stadium on 9 October, losing 1–0 to Tottenham, but the Italian highly praised his teams performance.

On 10 October, Enock Mwepu announced he had been forced to retire due to a hereditary heart condition. Brighton thrashed Chelsea 4–1 on 29 October, beating Graham Potter's men on his first return to Falmer Stadium since he left for the Blues, with De Zerbi claiming his first Brighton win.

Mid-season break for World Cup 
During the mid-season break for the World Cup, Brighton headed to Dubai on a training camp where they later played a friendly against Aston Villa on 8 December. They drew 2–2 with the fellow Premier League opposition with Deniz Undav scoring a brace.

Brighton players at the 2022 FIFA World Cup 

Brighton were sixth in the Premier League for player representation at the 2022 FIFA World Cup with eight players heading to Qatar for the mid-season competition starting on 20 November.

Jeremy Sarmiento    – Ecuador (Group stage exit)
Moisés Caicedo      – Ecuador (1 goal scored, Group stage exit)
Pervis Estupiñán    – Ecuador (Group stage exit)
Alexis Mac Allister – Argentina (1 goal scored, Winner)
Kaoru Mitoma        – Japan (Group of 16 exit)
Tariq Lamptey       – Ghana (Group stage exit)
Robert Sánchez      – Spain (Group of 16 exit)
Leandro Trossard    – Belgium (Group stage exit)

Post-World Cup

On 20 December, Brighton's first match since the conclusion of the World Cup, they faced an away trip to League One side Charlton Athletic in the fourth round of the EFL Cup. The game finished 0–0, with Solly March firing over his penalty in the shootout to miss the opportunity to send Albion through to the quarter-finals, with Brighton eventually losing. Five days later on Boxing Day, March redeemed himself, scoring his first goal in over two years with a 20-yard thumper in the 3–1 away win over Southampton, where he also assisted Adam Lallana's goal against his former club. On 31 December, in the 4–2 home defeat against league leaders Arsenal, Albions 18-year-old Evan Ferguson scored his first Premier League goal, becoming Brighton's youngest ever goalscorer in the league.  After the turn of the year on 3 January 2023, Ferguson scored again on his first Premier League start, also assisting March's second goal of the season in the 4–1 away victory over Everton. Brighton graduate Andrew Moran made his Premier League debut as a substitute in the game. On 29 January, Brighton beat defending champions Liverpool in the FA Cup fourth round to advance to the fifth. This victory meant that Brighton had gone three games unbeaten – one draw, two victories – against Liverpool in the 2022–23 season.  In the fifth round of the cup competition, on 28 February captain and hometown boy Lewis Dunk made his 400th Brighton appearance, helping the Albion progress into the quarter-final after a 1–0 away win over Championship side Stoke City. On 4 March, long term back-up keeper Jason Steele made his second Premier League appearance of his career – his first coming in November 2021 – keeping his first top flight clean sheet in the 4–0 home win over West Ham. After being selected ahead of Robert Sánchez against the Hammers, the 32-year-old was given a run of game time and preferred to than the Spanish keeper with De Zerbi saying that "maybe he [Steele] is closer than Robert in my style."
On 15 March, Pascal Groß made his 200th Seagulls appearance, helping Brighton defeat their bitter rivals Crystal Palace at Falmer Stadium with former Palace youth player Solly March scoring the only goal of the game.

Transfers
In

Out

Loans in

Loans out

 First team transfer summary 

Pre-season and friendlies
On 17 June, Brighton announced details for their pre-season friendly games. Two matches against Union SG and Brentford will take place at the clubs training ground, the American Express Elite Football Performance Centre and an away fixture was announced against Reading at the Madejski Stadium. Espanyol was later confirmed as the pre-season finale.

Competitions
Overall record

Premier League

League table

Results summary

Results by round

Matches

On 16 June, the Premier League fixtures were released.

FA Cup

Brighton joined the competition at the third round stage, and were drawn away to Middlesbrough. In the fourth round a home tie against Liverpool was confirmed.

EFL Cup

Brighton entered the competition in the second round and were drawn away to Forest Green Rovers, the first time the senior team have played there. In the fourth round, another away tie was drawn, against Charlton Athletic.

Squad statistics
Appearances
Players listed with no appearances have been in the matchday squad but only as unused substitutes.

|-
! colspan=14 style=background:#dcdcdc; text-align:center|Goalkeepers

|-

|-
! colspan=14 style=background:#dcdcdc; text-align:center|Defenders

|-
! colspan=14   style=background:#dcdcdc; text-align:center|Midfielders    
             

  

|-
! colspan=14 style=background:#dcdcdc; text-align:center|Forwards

|-
! colspan=17 style=background:#dcdcdc; text-align:center| First team players who left the club permanently or on loan during the season 

|}Note'''

• Shane Duffy joined Fulham on 5 August on a season-long loan, made into a permanent transfer on 31 January 2023

• Kjell Scherpen joined Vitesse on 16 August on a season-long loan.

• Matthew Clarke joined Middlesbrough on 25 August on a permanent transfer.

• Neal Maupay joined Everton on 26 August on a permanent transfer.

• Florin Andone joined UD Las Palmas on 1 September on a permanent transfer.

• Steven Alzate joined Standard Liège on 9 September on a season-long loan.

• Enock Mwepu announced he was forced to retire on 10 October, due to a hereditary heart condition.

• Ed Turns joined Leyton Orient on 13 January for the rest of the season on loan.

• Leandro Trossard joined Arsenal on 20 January on a permanent transfer.

• James Furlong joined Motherwell on 31 January for the rest of the season on loan.

• Jack Spong joined Crawley Town on 31 January for the rest of the season on loan.

• Antef Tsoungui joined Lommel on 31 January for the rest of the season on loan.

GoalscorersAs of 19 March 2023''
A blank squad number indicates the player has been transferred or loaned to another club.

See also
 2022–23 in English football
 List of Brighton & Hove Albion F.C. seasons

References

Brighton & Hove Albion F.C. seasons
Brighton and Hove Albion
English football clubs 2022–23 season